Mrgashat, is a major village in the Armavir Province of Armenia. A Bronze Age archaeological site is found near the village.

See also 
Armavir Province

References 

World Gazeteer: Armenia – World-Gazetteer.com

Populated places in Armavir Province